Nikolai Vasilyevich Agafonov (born 15 June 1947) is a Russian professional football coach and a former player.

External links
 Career summary by Footballfacts

1947 births
Living people
Soviet footballers
FC Dynamo Barnaul players
Soviet football managers
Russian footballers
FC Tom Tomsk managers
FC Ural Yekaterinburg managers
Russian Premier League managers
Association football midfielders